December 11, 1961 Demonstrations Stadium, is a multi-use stadium in Chelghoum Laïd, Algeria. It is currently used mostly for football matches and is the home ground of HB Chelghoum Laïd. The stadium has a capacity of 10,000 spectators.

References

Stadiums
Sports venues in Algeria